Robinson's Sporting Goods is in a historic building in Victoria, British Columbia, Canada.

See also
 List of historic places in Victoria, British Columbia

References

External links
 

Buildings and structures in Victoria, British Columbia